The First Gyurcsány Government was the sixth government of Hungary after the regime change from October 4, 2004 to June 9, 2006.

History 
The government came to power after the resignation of Prime Minister Péter Medgyessy. The coalition formed by the MSZP and the SZDSZ has survived. The oath of office was taken by the government on 4 October 2004. The government led by Ferenc Gyurcsány was in office as the executive government after the 2006 election victory until June 9, and then continued its work under the name of the Second Gyurcsány Government.

Party breakdown

Composition

References

Hungarian governments
2004 establishments in Hungary
2016 disestablishments in Hungary
Cabinets established in 2004
Cabinets disestablished in 2006
Government 1